Zemirot or Z'miros ( zǝmîrôt, singular: zimrah but often called by the masculine zemer) are Jewish hymns, usually sung in the Hebrew or Aramaic languages, but sometimes also in Yiddish or Ladino.  The best known  are those sung around the table during Shabbat and to some extent the Jewish holidays.  The Sabbath  are specifically associated with each of the three obligatory meals of Shabbat, such as those sung for the Friday evening meal, the Saturday day meal, and the third Sabbath meal just before sundown on Saturday afternoon.  In some editions of the Jewish prayerbook (siddur), the words to these hymns are printed after the opening prayer (kiddush) for each meal.

The term  is most typically used by Ashkenazi Jews to describe Sabbath table songs. When used by Spanish and Portuguese Jews, zemirot refers to the sequence of psalms in the morning service, known to other communities by the Talmudic name p'suqe d'zimra. The Sephardic communities often use the term pizmonim to describe their own tradition of extra-liturgical, domestic songs, albeit these songs are more commonly sung at times other than Shabbat.

In Yiddish, the variant zemerl (plural: zmires) is also used.

Words and lyrics 
Many  consist of poems written by various rabbis and sages during the early Middle Ages, which were then set to music at a later point. The extra-liturgical domestic tradition of singing the zemirot increasingly gained a foothold in Jewish praxis by the 11th to 12th centuries. In the 16th century, poets began in earnest to write extra-liturgical zemirot for the domestic sphere, especially kabbalists of Safed and Italy such as Isaac Luria and Israel Najara, who authored zemirot reflecting a mystical renaissance in Jewish thought they were pioneering at the time. Using the tunes or styles of surrounding gentile musical selections from the Levant and Turkey, and at times deploying their metaphorical strategies as well, these zemirot have diffused throughout the Jewish world similarly to the influential mystical ideologies on which they depend.

Others of the zemirot were likely conceived as anonymous folk songs that have been passed down from generation to generation. Lyrically, zemirot tend to focus on the themes of the Sabbath or the specific holiday being celebrated while employing intertextual references to the extended Jewish canon from sources as diverse as the Bible, mystical works like Sefer Yetzirah, Midrash, or Talmudical or legal literature for either artistic or expressive reasons. Certain songs are primarily didactic, listing Sabbath prohibitions and issuing recommendations for pious conduct, while underscoring the ideas of Shabbat as a treasure and covenant. Often the lyrical tie-in to Shabbat is merely implicit. Over time, various songs have acquired an association with the Sabbath or holidays based on their incorporation of metaphors for Shabbat such as redemption and Jewish chosenness, even when mention of Shabbat is absent. These heightened themes reinforce the spiritual goals of Shabbat observance.

Melodies 
The melodies of the zemirot vary greatly from one Jewish community to another, a result of the adaptation of Jewish liturgical content to what was available, namely local tunes and/or styles of music amid non-Jews. Hence, repertoires will differ among the diverse Jewish exilic communities in which they originated. In certain European centers, the zemirot were devised to be purposely accessible, hewing close to the melodic models of German folksongs so as to support the participation of the wider community in singing. The zemirot in their simplicity often proved a counterpoint to the growing elaborateness of cantorial synagogal liturgical music. Even still, the zemirot have lent themselves to the occasional insertion of opulent cantorial phrases, differentiating these zemirot from the gentile folk repertoires by uniting them with specifically Jewish musical developments. Still, at least some Ashkenazi tunes were conceived of for soloists in a more virtuosic vein, particularly for songs with deviating verse lengths (i.e. in contrast to the norm of zemirot alternating between choruses and verses of fixed length). By contrast, Sephardic tunes are generally more florid. One famous hymn, Adon Olam, (Ruler of the Universe) has proven particularly adaptable, and has been set to numerous tunes.  Jews of different backgrounds enjoy sharing the various versions when they meet around the Sabbath table.   New tunes continue to be written today for the same ancient lyrics. It is currently relatively rare, however, for new zemer-type lyrics to be written, except for in the Sephardic and Mizrachi Jewish communities, (e.g. Aharon Amram, Asher Mizrachi, etc.) where pizmonim continue to be penned.

History 

The zemirot are quintessentially associated with the Shabbat table, as a domestic form of liturgy constituting a pious practice for participants and vying in stature with synagogal singing. The inclusion of songs into the gustatory rites of Shabbat is thought to help achieve the Jewish religious aspiration of transforming the domestic table into a recreation of the Temple altar, which would have been as prestigious as singing in a synagogue, meant to be a local stand-in for the Temple as a whole. The first evidence for the practice of singing zemirot occurs in the northern French manuscript Machzor Vitry, from around the turn of the 13th century. Per scholar Albert Kohn, the Machzor Vitry included a fixed repertoire of day and evening meal songs as a rabbinic initiative to create a domestically situated liturgy complete with sophisticated song texts for the occasion, particularly from poetry written by rabbis such as Ibn Ezra and other masters. According to Rabbi Eleazar of Worms, the zemirot could also have had various functional uses, becoming ritualized occasions for separating between the obligatory meals of Shabbat lunch and the third meal, or substituting for Grace after Meals.

Friday Night Zemirot 
There are three mandated meals for Shabbat, and each meal is associated with its own zemirot - yet the association was in flux, particularly when it came to separating between the Shabbat lunch and the third meal. Generally, the earliest compilations of zemirot featured very few nighttime zemirot, favoring daytime zemirot, perhaps for the functional advantages of daytime zemirot such as the greater ease of reading lyric sheets in daylight (although some commentators have maintained that a reason for lighting Shabbat candles is to enable singing of the zemirot). Generally, there are more mystically laden themes in the night meal songs compared to the daytime songs. While mystical songs like Isaac Luria's Asader Seudata trilogy were annexed to each of Shabbat's three meals, there is a greater proportion of such songs sung at night.

The Friday Night Zemirot can be separated into the songs that are sung before Kiddush to prepare for it and those that are sung afterwards between courses, or alongside conversations.

Pre-Kiddush Zemirot include
 Shalom Aleichem (Unknown Author), sung to greet the visiting Shabbat angels and secure the blessings of the Shabbat angels.
 Eishet Chayil (Proverbs 31:10-31), an allegorical song about a woman of valor, often sung in praise of the participation of women in the preparations for Shabbat.
 Ribon Kol Ha'Olamim 
 Azameir Bishvachin (Isaac Luria), part of Luria's Shabbat trilogy for the three Shabbat meals, taking place in the apple orchard where mystical events can take place within the sefirotic context.

Other Friday Night Zemirot include 
 Bar Yochai (Rabbi Shimon Lavi) in praise of the proto-messianic contributions of the Tannaitic sage, Shimon bar Yochai, qua authoring the Zohar.
 Kah Echsof (Aharon of Karlin (II)), is a rare Hasidic zemer. There is controversy surrounding its most common melody, which may have been used for another song, before being grafted onto Kah Echsof. The song describes the soul's yearning for it to be the day of Shabbat and confines its discussion to metaphysical and spiritualistic themes.
 Yah Ribon Olam (Israel Najara), sung in Aramaic, which uses references from the Book of Daniel to describe God's ultimate sovereignty over the array of created beings. 
 Kol Beruei (ibn Gabirol) rehashes the poet's Neo-Platonic philosophical conceptions of the universe and of creation.
 Kol Mekadeish affirms the importance of dedicating oneself to Shabbat observance.
 Mah Yafit
 Mah Yedidut (an otherwise-unidentified poet whose name, Menachem, is spelled by the initial letters of each stanza)
 Menuchah v'Simcha
 Odeh La'Kel (Shmaya Kasson)
 Racheim B'Chasdecha
 Tsur Mishelo
 Tsama Nafshi (Abraham Ibn Ezra) combines Neo-Platonic references and descriptions of the heavenly serenading of God.
 Ya'alah Bo'i L'Gani (Israel Najara) utilizes imagery of a garden, likening Israel to an ibex.
 Yom Zeh L'Yisrael

Saturday Lunch Zemirot 
The earliest zemirot compilations featured numerous day songs. The repertoire today includes several migrant compositions like Baruch Kel Elyon that in other eras were sung to close the sabbath. One reason for this confusion could be that many of the zemirot were written to bridge Shabbat lunch and the third meal, typically by functioning as a type of musical substitute for grace after meals.
 Al Ahavat'cha
 Baruch Hashem Yom Yom (Rabbi Moreinu Shimon ben Rabbeinu Yitschak)
 Baruch Kel Elyon (Rabbi Baruch ben Samuel)
 Chay Hashem
 Deror Yikra (Dunash ben Labrat)
 Ki Eshm'ra Shabbat (Abraham Ibn Ezra)
 Malechet Machshevet Bi (Ariel Amsellem)
 Shabbat Hayom L'Hashem (Shmuel HeHasid)
 Shimru Shabtotai
 Yom Shabbaton (Rabbi Judah Halevi)
 Yoducha Rayonai (Israel Najara)
 Yom Zeh Mechubad

Third Meal (Seuda Shlishit, Shalosh Seudos) 
Shalosh Sudos is the third mandatory meal eaten for Shabbat. Unlike the other two meals, kiddush is not recited for it, but one does wash to eat bread. In the Chabad community, no meal per se is eaten. Instead, grains or special fruits will be utilized.
 Kel Mistater
 Askinu Seudata B'nei Heichala
 Mizmor L'David (Psalm 23)
 Yedid Nefesh

Ladino (Hekatia, Judaeo-Spanish, Judaeo-Catalan, Judaeo-Portuguese) Zemirot 
 Bendigamos Al Altissimo. This is very similar to other songs about bentsching. 
 Kuando el rey Nimrod
 Dezilde a Mi Amor
 Dos Amantes
 El Rey Por Muncha Madruga
 La Mujer de Teraj
 La Rosa Enflorence
 Las Compras del Rabino
 Los Caminos de Sirkeci
 Los Guisados de la Berenjena
 Marinero Soy de Amor. The lyrics are taken from poetry by Miguel de Cervantes. The song exemplifies the genre of saudade, or a song of nostalgia and homesickness sung by the Portuguese. In this case, the poem expresses an exilic longing for the high culture of the medieval Iberian Peninsula or for Zion. 
 Morena
 Non Komo Muestro Dio
 Ocho Kandelikas
 Pesah en la Mano
 Scalerica de Oro
 Shir Nashir
 Yo En Estando/La Adultera

See also
 Religious Jewish music
 Shabbat

References

External links
 The Zemirot Database
 Traditional Sephardi Zemirot
 Shabbat Zemirot Videos

Jewish liturgical poems
Hebrew-language songs
Shabbat
Jewish music
Religious music
Vocal music
Jewish music genres
Hebrew words and phrases in Jewish prayers and blessings
Zemirot